Mi Na may refer to:

Mi Na (painter) (born 1980), Chinese painter
Mi Na (athlete) (born 1986), Paralympian athlete from China

See also
Son Mi-Na (born 1964), South Korean handball player 
 Mina (disambiguation)
 Na-mi